ŽS series 641 is a Serbian code for shunting Hungarian-made diesel-electric locomotive class on Serbian Railways. Formerly it was operated by Yugoslav Railways under designation JŽ series 641. This class has nickname "Mađarica" (Hungarian girl) as they were produced in Hungary.

History
Originally JŽ series 641 was known as MÁV M44, similar to PKP class SM41. This series was produced from 1960 to 1985. First four locomotives were delivered to Yugoslav industry - two to  "Đuro Salaj" paper factory from Krško, Slovenia, one to UNIS factory from Vogošća, Bosnia and Herzegovina, and one to Glogovac nickel mine at Kosovo. Other 31 locomotives were delivered to Yugoslav Railways Belgrade section that later become Serbian Railways.

There are today 13 locomotives of this series operated by Serbian Railways. This locomotives are built for heavy shunting, hauling lighter freight trains and also for  lighter passenger trains.

Livery
Locomotives have original dark green livery while some overhauled locomotives have orange livery.

References

External links

Diesel locomotives - Serbian Railways official web site

Bo′Bo′ locomotives
641
Ganz locomotives
Standard gauge locomotives of Serbia
Standard gauge locomotives of Yugoslavia
Diesel-electric locomotives of Yugoslavia